In Ancient Greek grammar, a perispomenon is a word with a high-low pitch contour on the last syllable, indicated in writing by a circumflex accent mark. A properispomenon has the same kind of accent, but on the penultimate syllable.

Examples:
, theoû, "of a god",  is a perispomenon
 prâxis "business" is a properispomenon

Etymology
Peri-spṓmenon means "pronounced with a circumflex", the neuter of the present passive participle of peri-spáō "pronounce with a circumflex" (also "draw off"). Pro-peri-spṓmenon adds the prefix pró "before".  is the Greek name for the accent mark.

See also
Greek diacritics
Circumflex
Pitch accent
Ultima (linguistics)
Tone (linguistics)

References

Greek grammar
Ancient Greek
Phonology